This list of animation awards is an index of articles about notable awards for animation. It excludes animated feature films awards, which are covered by a separate list. It includes a list of Japanese anime awards.

General

Anime awards

See also

 Lists of awards
 List of media awards
 List of film awards
 List of animated feature films awards
 List of television awards
 List of Anime Grand Prix winners
 List of submissions to the Academy Award for Best Animated Feature
 List of lists of lists

References

 
 
Animation